Platanthera holmboei is a species of orchid native to the eastern Mediterranean (northern Israel, Syria, Lebanon, Turkey, the Greek Islands, and Cyprus).

References

External links
Tübives, Türkiye Bitkileri Veri Servisi, Turkish Plants Data Service, Taxon Page
Josef Hlasek, new photos
The Plant Encyclopedia, Platanthera holmboei
Swiss Orchid Foundation
IOSPE orchid photos, Platanthera holmboei H.Lindb. 1942  Plant and Flowers in situ Photos by © Anke A and courtesy of Terrestrial Orchid Gallery 

holmboei
Flora of Western Asia
Plants described in 1942